Brillia is a genus of non-biting midges in the subfamily Orthocladiinae of the family (Chironomidae).

Species
B. bifida (Kieffer 1909)
B. flavifrons (Johannsen 1905)
B. flavifrons (Johannsen, 1905)
B. laculata Oliver and Roussel, 1983
B. longifurca Kieffer 1921
B. modesta (Meigen, 1830)
B. parva Joahnnsen, 1934
B. pudorosa Cobo, Gonzales & Vieira-Lanero 1995
B. retifinis Sæther, 1969
B. sera Roback, 1957

References 

Chironomidae
Nematocera genera